Crepis pusilla is a species of plants in the family Asteraceae.

Sources

References 

pusilla
Flora of Malta